Christopher Glynn Ragland (born June 18, 1984) is an American actor.

Early life
Ragland was born in Winnetka, Illinois on June 18, 1984.

Career
Ragland has provided voices for numerous video games including Driver: San Francisco. He also starred in the documentary series, I Shouldn't Be Alive, as Travis Wright.

He joined the voice cast of Thomas & Friends in 2015. He voices Percy in the US dub taking over from Martin T. Sherman, who also voiced Thomas.  Ragland also voices the Troublesome Trucks in both the UK and US taking over from Ben Small, and Trevor in the US. His wife, Rachael Miller, joined the cast of the series in 2018, and voices new main cast regular Rebecca in addition to numerous extra supporting and minor characters.

Aside from Thomas & Friends, Ragland has also lent his voice to several other animated projects including the films Inside Out and Minions, the English dubs of Sherlock Yack, My Knight and Me and Scary Larry and an episode of The Amazing World of Gumball.

Personal life
Ragland currently resides in London, England. He was married to voice actress Rachael Miller who also voiced Rebecca and several characters in the twenty second season of Thomas & Friends and the movie Thomas and Friends: Big World! Big Adventures!.

Filmography

Film

Television

Video games

References

External links

Christopher Ragland on Twitter

1984 births
American male film actors
American male television actors
American male voice actors
People from Winnetka, Illinois
Living people
American expatriates in the United Kingdom
American expatriate male actors in the United Kingdom